João Casimiro Namorado de Aguiar (28 October 1943 – 3 June 2010) was a Portuguese writer and journalist. He spent his youth in Portuguese Mozambique.

Aguiar was born and died in Lisbon.  After working for a time in the Portuguese tourist industry in Brussels and Amsterdam, he studied journalism at the Free University of Brussels and in 1976 returned to Portugal to work as a journalist.

He worked for RTP (where he began his career in 1963) and a variety of daily and weekly periodicals such as the Daily News, A Luta, Diário Popular, O País, and Sábado. In 1981 he was named press secretary of the Ministry of Quality of Life, a short-lived government department concerned with sports and the environment. He was a regular contributor to the monthly magazine Superinteressante and sat on its editorial board. He died of cancer on 3 June 2010 in Lisbon.

He dedicated himself to literature, being one of the most acclaimed Portuguese novelists in the genre of the historical novel.

Major works
 An Investigation of Portuguese Esotericism (Uma incursão no esoterismo português) (1983)
 The Voice of the Gods (A Voz dos Deuses) (1984)
 The Man With No Name (O homem sem nome) (1986)
 The Throne of the Most High (O trono do altíssimo) (1988)
 The Song of the Phantasms (O canto dos fantasmas) (1990)
 The Pearl-Eaters (Os comedores de pérolas) (1992)
 The Hour of Sertorius (A hora de Sertório) (1994)
 The Eulogy of the Spirits (A encomendação das almas) (1995)
 Solitary Navigator (Navegador solitário) (1996)
 Inês of Portugal (Inês de Portugal) (1997)
 The Dragon of Smoke (O dragão de fumo) (1998)
 The Green Cathedral (A catedral verde)  (2000)
 A Goddess in the Fog (Uma Deusa na Bruma) (2003)
 The Seventh Hero (O sétimo herói) (2004)
 The Garden of Delights (O jardim das delícias) (2005)
 The Sitting Tiger (O tigre sentado) (2005, 2nd edition)
 Lapedo – A Child in the Valley (Lapedo – uma criança no vale) (2006)
 The Priory of the Cifrão (O priorado do cifrão) (2008)

Children's fiction
 The Group of Four (O Bando dos Quatro)
 Sebastian and the Secret Worlds (Sebastião e os Mundos Secretos)

Other works
 The White Orchid (A Orquídea Branca), libretto for an opera with music by Jorge Salgueiro (premiered 27 October 2008)
 I Saw the Third Reich Fall (Eu vi morrer o III Reich) by Manuel Homem de Mello (edited and with commentary by João Aguiar) (Ediciones Vega, Lisboa)

References

External links
  Website with biography and photos
  Information about the author

1943 births
2010 deaths
Portuguese journalists
Male journalists
Portuguese male writers
People from Lisbon
Free University of Brussels (1834–1969) alumni
Deaths from cancer in Portugal